The New Age Steppers is the debut studio album by The New Age Steppers. It was released on On-U Sound in 1981.

Critical reception

Andy Kellman of AllMusic gave the album 4 out of 5 stars, commenting that "the record epitomizes the spirit of the exciting late-'70s/early-'80s crossbreeding that took place between punk and reggae." Ira Robbins of Trouser Press called the album "intriguing, if not entirely successful". David Katz of Fact wrote, "the New Age Steppers' eponymous debut is a messy, self-indulgent set that points in several directions at once, ultimately forming a sonic marker of an era when the link between punk and dub was anything but tenuous."

Track listing

Personnel
Credits adapted from liner notes.

 Ari Up – vocals
 Vivien Goldman – vocals
 Mark Stewart – vocals
 John Waddington – guitar
 Viv Albertine – guitar
 Antonio "Crucial Tony" Phillips – guitar
 George Oban – bass guitar
 Steve Beresford – bass guitar, piano, percussion effects
 Sean Oliver – piano
 Vikki Aspinall – violin
 Bruce Smith – synthesizer, drums, percussion effects
 Style Scott – drums
 Cecil – drums
 Stephen "Shoes" New – drums
 Dan Sheals – drums
Technical
 Nobby Turner – percussion effects, engineering
 Adrian Sherwood – production, mixing
 Bob – engineering
 Andy Martin (credited as Bill Bell) – artwork

References

External links
 

1981 debut albums
Albums produced by Adrian Sherwood
On-U Sound Records albums